The BAR 006 was a Formula One car that competed in the 2004 Formula One season. The car was driven by Jenson Button and Takuma Sato, and the official test driver was Anthony Davidson. The car scored 11 podiums and a single pole position, with the BAR-Honda team finishing second in the  championship. The BAR-Honda 006 was officially launched at Circuit de Catalunya, Spain on 1 February.

Season 

From the onset of the season, the car proved to be very competitive with Jenson Button scoring six podiums from the first eight races, including his first podium in Malaysia as well as his first pole position in Imola. The podiums continued with Takuma Sato becoming the first Japanese driver to score a podium since 1990 at Indianapolis and Button taking four further podiums in the latter stages of the season. Overall the car scored 11 podiums and one pole position.

After a close fight with Renault, BAR-Honda finished second in the Constructors' Championship, beating every team except Ferrari. Button, who many tipped as driver of the year, finished third in the Drivers' Championship. Despite some reliability problems for Sato, he finished eighth in the Drivers' Championship, the best-ever result for a Japanese driver in Formula One.

Livery 
The team's third driver, Anthony Davidson, drove the Spanish, Italian and Brazilian friday practice sessions with a new colouring. FIA regulations allowed the third car to have a different livery from the racecars; the task was to create a design for title sponsor Lucky Strike that showed the progression of the livery over the last few years, and also to come up with a new concept. In Spain, a black and white colour scheme appeared on Davidson's car. In Italy, Davidson's the car had an x-ray effect that incorrectly showed the driver's feet. In Brazil, there was a "graffiti"-style paint job that included Davidson's own face, and on the side of the car the words "Brazil 04".

In China team owner British American Tobacco wanted to promote its 555 branding and thus all team members, including all three drivers, wore special blue-yellow overalls and clothing throughout the weekend. Davidson drove a blue-yellow 555-coloured car in Friday's practice. Button and Sato drove all weekend with the traditional red and white Lucky Strike-coloured car.

BAR used 'Lucky Strike' logos in all other races except the Spanish, Canadian, French, and British Grands Prix, and '555' logos in China.

BAR 05 
During the 2004-2005 offseason, BAR used the 05 Concept Car, a modified version of the 006, notably featuring a black and gray livery, the Honda RA005E engine from the following season, as well as the rear end of the future 007.

Complete Formula One results
(key) (results in bold indicate pole position)

References

BAR 006 Honda info and specs, www.UltimateCarPage.com.

2004 Formula One season cars
BAR Formula One cars